Finghin MacCarthy Reagh was the 10th Prince of Carbery from 1478 to his death in 1505. He belonged to the MacCarthy Reagh dynasty, and was the eldest son of Dermod an Duna MacCarthy Reagh, 8th Prince of Carbery. He was born in 1425 or 1430.

Life
He was held in high regard by Henry VII of England, who in 1484 "authorized" (encouraged) him, along with his kinsman Cormac MacTeige, Lord of Muskerry, to receive the homage of the various Irish lords and chiefs of the region.

It was for Finghin and his wife Katherine that the famous Book of Lismore was compiled.

Marriage and issue
Finghin married Katherine, daughter of Thomas FitzGerald, 7th Earl of Desmond, and they had issue:

 Donal MacFineere MacCarthy Reagh, 12th Prince of Carbery
 Donogh
 Dermod
 Ilin, married James de Barry, Lord Ibane
with the possible addition of another son, Cormac.

References

Medieval Gaels from Ireland
MacCarthy dynasty
Irish lords
1505 deaths
15th-century Irish people
16th-century Irish people
Year of birth unknown